Mykawa may refer to:
 Mykawa, Houston
 Shinpei Mykawa